The 1941	New South Wales state election was held on 10 May 1941. This election was for all of the 90 seats in the 33rd New South Wales Legislative Assembly and was conducted in single-member constituencies with compulsory preferential voting.

Background
The	replacement of Jack Lang by William McKell as leader of the Labor Party in 1939 reunited and rejuvenated the party. A small number of Labor party members continued to support the far-left-wing State Labor Party (Hughes-Evans) but that had minimal impact on the election results. The Labor Party moved away from Lang's populist, inflationary policies, which were seen as extremist by many voters in the middle ground of the political spectrum. McKell also improved the party's standing in rural electorates by personally selecting well-known local candidates.

By contrast, the internal party divisions and lack of policy direction affecting the United Australia Party (UAP) had resulted in Alexander Mair replacing Bertram Stevens as leader of the UAP and Premier in August 1939. The problems continued in the period prior to the election and throughout the course of the new parliament. These divisions were reflected federally in the forced resignation of Robert Menzies as the Prime Minister in August 1941, and the UAP disintegrated at a state level in 1943. The remnants of the UAP combined with the newly formed Commonwealth Party to form the Democratic Party in that year. Mair remained Leader of the Opposition until 10 February 1944 when he was replaced by Reginald Weaver.

The result of the election was a landslide victory for the Labor Party:
Australian Labor Party 54 seats
Independent Labor 1 seat
United Australia Party 14 seats
Independent UAP 5 seats
Country Party 12 seats
Independent 4 seats.

The Labor Party government of McKell had a majority of 18 and McKell remained Premier throughout the term of the Parliament. The Labor Party won two further seats from the Country Party at by-elections during the parliament. Jack Lang was expelled from the Labor Party in 1943, having persistently attacked the governments of McKell and Australian Prime minister John Curtin. Lang remained in parliament as the sole representative of Lang Labor.

This would be the first of NSW Labor's eight consecutive election victories.

Key dates

Results

{{Australian elections/Title row
| table style = float:right;clear:right;margin-left:1em;
| title			= New South Wales state election, 10 May 1941
| house			= Legislative Assembly
| series		= New South Wales state election
| back			= 1938
| forward		= 1944
| enrolled		= 1,684,781
| total_votes	= 1,389,896
| turnout %		= 92.52
| turnout chg	= −3.27
| informal		= 35,858
| informal %	= 2.52
| informal chg	= −0.13
}}

|}

Retiring members

Changing seats

See also
 Members of the New South Wales Legislative Assembly, 1941–1944
 Candidates of the 1941 New South Wales state election

Notes

References

Elections in New South Wales
New South Wales state election
1940s in New South Wales
New South Wales state election